Gormanston railway station (often mistakenly written Gormanstown) serves Gormanston, County Meath, Ireland. It is located between Balbriggan and Laytown, north of a cast-iron bridge on which the line crosses the River Delvin.

History

The station opened in May 1845 as part of the Dublin and Drogheda Railway. In 1876 it was taken over by the Great Northern Railway (Ireland).

It was the scene of a shooting during the Irish Civil War. On Monday 29 May 1922, Staff Captain James Flanagan (Anti-Treaty IRA) was shot by members of the Royal Irish Constabulary. A Royal Irish Constabulary officer was also killed.

Buildings and facilities

The station has a single-storey wooden station building on the up platform which was partially demolished to make way for a car park. A GNR style waiting room is located on the up platform. At the north end of the down platform was a signal cabin. This was moved to Dromod, Co. Leitrim, and is preserved there. A brick goods shed and the adjacent single storey station masters house stand the north end of the station.

Accidents and incidents
On Monday 21 October 1974, a three-train collision at Gormanston killed two people and injured 29.

See also
 List of railway stations in Ireland

References

External links 
 Irish Rail Gormanston Station Website
 Eiretrains - Gormanston Station

Iarnród Éireann stations in County Meath
Railway stations in County Meath
Railway stations opened in 1845
Railway stations in the Republic of Ireland opened in 1845